The McGarrigle Christmas Hour is the tenth album by Kate & Anna McGarrigle, released in 2005. A sequel to their 1998 album The McGarrigle Hour, the album features a program of Christmas music recorded by the McGarrigles, their family and a number of friends and collaborators. It was also the last album to be released by the duo before Kate's death in 2010.

Performers on the album include Kate's son and daughter Rufus and Martha, Anna's husband Dane Lanken and their children Lily and Sylvan, and Kate and Anna's sister Jane, as well as Emmylou Harris, Chaim Tannenbaum, Pierre Marchand, Joel Zifkin, Brad Albetta, Teddy Thompson and Beth Orton.

The album was named as number 21 in the list of 40 Essential Christmas Albums by Rolling Stone.

Track listing
The tracks chosen for the album are primarily traditional Christmas carols or pop standards, although several original Christmas-themed songs written by the participants were included as well.

 "Seven Joys of Mary" (Traditional) – 4:51
 "Old Waits Carol" (Traditional) – 2:36
 "O Little Town of Bethlehem" (Phillips Brooks, Lewis Redner) – 3:58
 "Il est né/Ça berger" (Traditional) – 4:35
 "What Are You Doing New Year's Eve" (Frank Loesser) – 3:02
 "Rebel Jesus" (Jackson Browne) – 4:10
 "Some Children See Him" (Alfred S. Burt, Wihla Hitson) – 3:56
 "Merry Christmas and Happy New Year" (Martha Wainwright) – 4:07
 "Counting Stars" (Ian Vincenzo Dow, Kate McGarrigle, Anna McGarrigle) – 3:19
 "Spotlight on Christmas" (Rufus Wainwright) – 3:23
 "Wise Men" (Kate McGarrigle, Anna McGarrigle) – 4:02 
 "Port Starboard Sox" (Pat Donaldson, Dane Lanken, Kate McGarrigle, Anna McGarrigle) – 3:27 
 "God Rest Ye Merry Gentlemen" (Traditional) – 3:27
 "Blue Christmas" (Billy Hayes, Jay Johnson) – 3:36

Personnel

References

External links
 

2005 Christmas albums
Christmas albums by Canadian artists
Folk Christmas albums
Kate & Anna McGarrigle albums
Nonesuch Records albums